The ACC Men's Premier Cup, previously the ACC Premier League, is the One Day International and Limited-overs (50 overs) international cricket tournament run by the Asian Cricket Council and contested in a league system. This is a part of the qualification pathway towards the Asia Cup. It used to evolve from the former ACC Trophy Elite cricket competition, played under three divisions. The first tournament was held in Malaysia in May 2014.

However, after first edition of Premier and Elite tournament, ACC reformed the tournament structure into regional, rather than divisional basis.

2014

2014 ACC Premier League

The first tournament was held in Malaysia between 1–7 May 2014. Afghanistan won the tournament. The top four teams, Afghanistan, UAE, Nepal and Oman qualified for the 2014 ACC Championship.

2014 ACC Elite League

The first tournament of second division ACC Premier League was held in Singapore between 7–13 June 2014. Singapore won the tournament and qualified for 2016 ACC Premier League. Saudi Arabia finishing second qualified for 2015 ICC World Cricket League Division Six.

2015 ACC Challenge League
The lowest division was supposed to be held in 2015. The participants in the tournament would be Brunei, China, Iran, Myanmar, Qatar and Thailand. But, the tournament was cancelled.

2023
ACC announced the new 2023 Asia Cup qualification pathway. A total of 8 associate teams would participate in the Challenger Cup, and the top two teams would be qualified for the Premier Cup. The Premier Cup would be a 10 team tournament with the matches played in it having List A status.

2023 ACC Men's Challenger Cup

2023 ACC Men's Premier Cup

See also
ACC Twenty20 Cup
ACC Championship
ACC Trophy

References

External links
 Tournament Page

Asian Cricket Council competitions